The Panellinion was the name given to the advisory body created on 23 April 1828 by Ioannis Kapodistrias, replacing the Legislative Body, as one of the terms he set to assume the governorship of the new country. The Panellinion was later replaced by the Senate during the Fourth National Assembly at Argos in July 1829. The body was named after the Panhellenion, a league of Greek city-states established by Emperor Hadrian.

The Panellinion had 27 members, split into three departments.

Before publishing Kapodistrias' decision regarding the 1829 elections, the Governor added 9 new members to overcome the obstructions he faced by the Panellinion. With the majority now on his side, he had support for his actions.

Notable members
Among the members of the Panellinion were:
Georgios Kountouriotis, minister of finance
Ioannis Kolettis
Petrobey Mavromichalis
Nikolaos Spiliadis
Viaros Kapodistrias, brother of Governor Kapodistrias and lawyer from Corfu, appointed by Kapodistrias
Ioannis Gennatas, lawyer from Corfu, appointed by Kapodistrias
Georgios Sisinis
Andreas Metaxas
Christodoulos Klonaris
Tatsis Magginas
Nikolaos Renieris
Andreas Zaimis
Lykourgos Logothetis
Andreas Kalamogdartis
Alexandros Mavrokordatos
Rigas Palamidis
Panos Ragos
Georgios Psyllas
Constantinos Zografos
Christodoulos Ainian
Alexandros Kontostavlos
Georgios Stavros

Committees
The committees of the Panellinion were:

Internal affairs
Andreas Zaimis, president
Georgios Psyllas
Christodoulos Ainian

Military affairs
Petrobey Mavromichalis
Constantinos Zografos
Christodouloas Klonaris

Finance
Georgios Kountouriotis
Nikolaos Spiliadis
A. Papadopoulos

Secretary
Spyridon Trikoupis was initially appointed but was later replaced by Spiliadis

References

1828 establishments in Greece
Greece
Defunct upper houses
Greek Senate
Political institutions of the Greek War of Independence
Ioannis Kapodistrias